Lashun Dill (born September 6, 1979) is a Bermudian footballer.

Club career
Dill began his career with Dandy Town Hornets, and played for the team for three years in the Bermudian Premier Division before joining the Bermuda Hogges in the USL Second Division in 2007. He also played for North Village Rams and currently plays in the veteran's Corona League for Butterfield & Vallis United.

International career
He made his debut for Bermuda in a March 2007 friendly match against Canada and earned a total of 7 caps, scoring no goals. He has represented his country in 3 FIFA World Cup qualification matches.

His final international match was a November 2011 World Cup qualification match against Barbados.

References

External links

1979 births
Living people
Association football wingers
Bermudian footballers
Bermuda international footballers
North Village Rams players
Dandy Town Hornets F.C. players
Bermuda Hogges F.C. players
USL Second Division players
USL League Two players